Deula is a village in West Bengal, India. It is administrated under the Bakhrabad gram panchayat, Narayangarh (community development block), Kharagpur Subdivision, West Medinipur District, West Bengal.

Demographics 
In the 2001 census, the village of Deula had 891 inhabitants, with 449 males (50.4%) and 442 females (49.6%), for a gender ratio of 984 females per thousand males.

Notes

Villages in Paschim Medinipur district